
The following is a list of unmade and unreleased animated projects by DreamWorks Animation. Some of these films or shows were, or still are, in development limbo. These also include the co-productions the studio collaborated with in the past (i.e. PDI/DreamWorks, Oriental DreamWorks, Aardman Animations, Columbus 81 Productions, Jay Ward Productions, World Events Productions, Double Dare You Productions, Scholastic Corporation and Amblin Entertainment), as well as sequels to their franchises.

1990s

1995

1998

1999

2000s

2001

2002

2005

2006

2007

2008

2009

2010s

In the 2010s, several films were announced to be made that were to be released in the next 3–4 years following their announcements. Some of these films were eventually cancelled while others are claimed to be in development and waiting for a release. Most of these films were cancelled due to massive layoffs, creative differences, management changes, no updates on the features, and Comcast eventually buying DreamWorks in 2016.

2010

2011

2012

2013

2014

2015

2017

2018

See also
 List of DreamWorks Animation productions
 List of Illumination productions
 List of Universal Animation Studios productions
 List of Paramount Pictures theatrical animated feature films
 List of 20th Century Studios theatrical animated feature films
 List of Universal Pictures theatrical animated feature films
 List of unproduced Paramount Pictures animated projects
 List of unproduced 20th Century Studios animated projects
 List of unproduced Universal Pictures animated projects

References

DreamWorks Animation
DreamWorks Animation
DreamWorks Animation
Unreleased DreamWorks Animation